Lucy Katz, J.D. is the Robert C. Wright Professor of Business Law, Ethics, and Dispute Resolution at Fairfield University in Fairfield, Connecticut.

Dr. Katz holds a bachelor's in Government from Smith College and earned her juris doctor degree from New York University School of Law. She is a member of the Academy of Legal Studies in Business. Before coming to Fairfield she practiced law with Koskoff, Koskoff and Bieder in Bridgeport, Connecticut.

References

Fairfield University faculty
Living people
American legal scholars
Year of birth missing (living people)